Agrupación Deportiva Colmenar Viejo is a club of football of Colmenar Viejo in the Community of Madrid, in Spain. Founded as a non-professional club in 1967, it has been playing in the regional Preferente, at the fifth level of the Spanish football league system, since the 2018–19 season. The club plays its home matches at Campo Municipal de Deportes Alberto Ruiz, which has seating for 1,200 spectators.

Season to season

{|
|valign="top" width=0%|

Totals by Tier 
As the divisions have been reallocated within the Spanish football league system from time to time, this table summarizes the tier that Colmenar Viejo competed at, agnostic of the division name.

As of the completion of the 2018–19 season, the club has never finished a season as champions of a tier 4 division, needed to gain entry to the annual Copa del Rey annual knockout competition organized by the Royal Spanish Football Federation.

Ground

Colmenar Viejo plays its home games at Campo Municipal de Deportes Alberto Ruiz (Alberto Ruiz Municipal Sports Field); the field was re-furbished, complete with a 1,200-seat grandstand and 156 solar panels, for a grand re-opening in September 2007.

References

External links 
Futbolme.com profile 
AD Colmenar Viejo on Futmadrid.com 
Federación de Fútbol de Madrid 

Football clubs in the Community of Madrid
Association football clubs established in 1967
1967 establishments in Spain